St Mary's Church is the civic church of Bury St Edmunds and is one of the largest parish churches in England. It claims to have the second longest nave (after Christchurch Priory), and the largest West Window of any parish church in the country. It was part of the abbey complex and originally was one of three large churches in the town (the others being St James, now St Edmundsbury Cathedral, and St Margaret's, now gone).

History
The church's full name is 'The church of the Assumption of the Blessed Virgin Mary'.

The present church is not the first building to stand on the site, the first being built in the seventh century, founded by King Sigeberht. The second church was built in the early twelfth century by Abbot Anselm to replace the previous church of St Mary which was demolished to make space for the construction of the south wing of the Abbey Church. However, nothing survives of the Norman church and the oldest part of the existing building is the decorated chancel (c. 1290). There was a major renovation between the 14th and 16th centuries and it is at this point that the nave, its aisles and the tower were built. It is also at this time that Mary Tudor, Queen of France, favourite sister of Henry VIII (not to be confused with his daughter Mary I of England), died and was buried in the abbey church. When the abbey was destroyed, her body was removed and reburied here in St Mary's. Her tomb is in the sanctuary directly to the north of the Lord's table. The church, however, is dedicated to Mary, the mother of Jesus, and not, as some mistakenly believe, to Mary Tudor. A tablet was erected to her memory in 1758. At the suggestion of Edward VII, who visited the church in 1904, a marble kerb surrounds her grave stone.

During the 16th century, John Notyngham and Jankyn Smyth, two wealthy local benefactors, bequeathed large amounts of money to the church. These funds contributed to building the north and south quire aisles, now the Lady Chapel and Royal Anglian (formerly Suffolk Regimental) chapel, two chantry chapels and a north and south porch. The north porch, known as the Notyngham porch, was built in 1437 in accordance with the will of John Notyngham. The south porch of 1523 was removed during a restoration in 1831. St Wolstan's chapel, on the north-west side, formerly held the Suffolk Regimental cenotaph until it was moved to the end of the north aisle. It now holds the church kitchen.

The west window is believed to be the largest of any parish church in the country, measuring 35 ft 6in by 8 ft 6in.

The church is awarded three stars by Simon Jenkins in his 1999 book England's Thousand Best Churches. Jenkins writes:
The interior has one of the largest and most exhilarating naves in the country. Arcades of ten majestic bays march towards the chancel, each rising on continuous mouldings with only the tiniest of capitals. The unusually wide hammerbeam roof is a marvellous survival. Eleven pairs of angels guard the space below, attended by lesser angels on the wallplates and by saints, martyrs, prophets and kings, 42 figures in all. On the frieze a medieval menagerie takes over, with dragons, unicorns, birds and fish. ... The south chapel is littered with pleasant brasses. The north aisle by the tower has its memorials spectacularly displayed. They climb up the wall to the ceiling, a valhalla of Bury worthies.

Choirs
St Mary's Church has a traditional Anglican choir of boys and gentlemen, with a history dating back to as early as 1354, after which there are many references to singers and ‘childs with a surplys’. This tradition is believed to have remained untouched even during Puritan times. The choir has more recently toured Spain, Turkey, Cyprus, Israel and Malta, France, Belgium, and Germany, and has sung evensongs at cathedrals including Canterbury and St Paul's. The Choir is affiliated to the RSCM, and choristers are trained using the RSCM Voice for Life scheme.

2010 saw the inception of St Mary's Ladies' Choir, and the Girls' Choir began in 2015. Although they are quite separate from the Church Choir, they join for large services, namely Easter, Harvest, Advent and Christmas.

Organ
There is evidence for an organ in St Mary's as early as 1467, in the will of John Baret which states that ‘ye pleyers at ye orgenys [to be paid] ij  d’. Another bequest from 1479 grants the organist 10d.

The main organ is a four-manual instrument with 79 speaking stops. Built initially by John Gray of London in 1825, it was rebuilt and enlarged in 1865, 1885, and 1898 by J. W. Walker. There have been later rebuilds by Hill, Norman and Beard in 1931, John Compton in 1959, and Kenneth Canter in 1988, the latter included providing a mobile console. The organ was over-hauled in 2009 by Clevedon Organ Services, and is equipped with a 250-channel memory.

A separate, portable four-stop chamber organ, possibly by John Harris (son of Renatus Harris, c. 1677 – 1743) is placed in the Suffolk Regimental Chapel and is occasionally used as a continuo instrument.

Organists 
The following list is taken from Peter Tryon's book.

 Ralph Guest 1796–1822
 Robert Nunn 1822–1863
 Thomas Bentick Richardson 1864–1893 (formerly chorister and assistant organist at Salisbury Cathedral)
 Matthew Kingston 1893–1896
 George William Boutell 1897–1909
 Edwin Percy Hallam 1909–1937 (subsequently organist at St Edmundsbury Cathedral)
 Clifton Cecil Day 1937–1942
 Dr Adcock 1942–1948
 Norman Holdford Jones 1948–1969
 John Fear 1969–1980
 David Ivory 1980–1982 (formerly assistant)
 Peter Tryon 1983–2015
 Adrian Marple 2015–2018 (formerly assistant; currently Director of Music at Inverness Cathedral)
 DB di Blasio 2018–2020 (formerly assistant)
 Richard Baker 2021–2022
 DB di Blasio 2023–present

Notable burials
 Mary Tudor, Queen of France and sister of Henry VIII, (d. 1533).
Nicholas Clagett the Elder (d. 1662), English Puritan cleric and ejected minister
Sir William Carew (d. 1501) of Bury St Edmunds,  created a knight banneret by King Henry VII, after the Battle of Blackheath (1496). He was the fifth son of Nicholas III Carew of Mohuns Ottery in Devon, by his wife Joan Courtenay (born 1411), a daughter of Sir Hugh Courtenay (1358–1425) of Haccombe in Devon and of Boconnoc in Cornwall, MP and Sheriff of Devon, a grandson of Hugh de Courtenay, 2nd/10th Earl of Devon (1303–1377) and grandfather of Edward Courtenay, 1st Earl of Devon (d.1509)
Robert Drury (d. 1536), Speaker of the House of Commons, and his wife Anne Calthorpe
George Kirbye (d. 1634), madrigalist and churchwarden of St Mary's
Peter Gedge (d. 1818), founder of the Bury and Norwich Post
John Reeve (d. 1540), last abbot of Bury St Edmunds

References

External links
 The Parish of St. Mary's with St. Peter's, Bury St. Edmunds

Bury Saint Edmunds